The Delaware, Lackawanna and Western Railroad's 1151 class comprised five 4-6-4 steam locomotives built by the American Locomotive Company (ALCO) in 1937. They were the last steam locomotives ordered by the railroad.

They were ordered to improve service on the Lackawanna's express passenger trains west of Scranton, Pennsylvania, towards Buffalo, New York. Apart from a six-mile helper district just west of Scranton and Dansville Hill between Groveland and Perkinsville, New York, this was flat, high-speed running. The railroad's existing 4-8-2 "Mountain" types were proving increasingly inadequate for this service as train lengths increased and because of the drag of air-conditioning equipment. However, the railroad's existing 4-8-4 "Pocono" types, used east of Scranton, were bigger and more powerful than this service required and such use would be wasteful. Therefore, the DL&W ordered five powerful Hudsons dedicated for this service.

While not quite equal to the Mountain types they replaced, their available power at speed was far greater. They were built alongside the New York Central Railroad's J-3a Hudsons at ALCO's plant in Schenectady, New York, which differed in being less powerful and booster-equipped, as well as being equipped with tenders with water scoops for track pans. The two classes had somewhat close total weights and axle loading and bore a superficial resemblance to one another.

To keep all the Lackawanna's six-drivered passenger power together in the 11xx number series, the new locomotives were numbered 1151–1155, taking the place of several Pacifics that had been recently converted into 0-8-0 switchers.

The five locomotives only lasted ten years in their original intended assignments, since the Lackawanna dieselized its express passenger trains in 1947.  The Hudsons were relegated to lesser assignments such as commuter trains, and began to be seen on the eastern end of the railroad.  One assignment was the early morning Merchants Express (Train 26) from Scranton to Hoboken, New Jersey, returning in the late afternoon hauling the Scrantonian (Train 11).  Another was the Interstate Express (Train 1301), received from the Reading Railroad/Jersey Central at Taylor Junction, near Scranton, and hauled to Binghamton, New York.  They also saw service between Binghamton and Syracuse on the Syracuse Branch.

Even in this service, they did not last long.  All five were withdrawn from service in 1951–1953 and subsequently scrapped; none of the railroad's later steam locomotives survived the cutter's torch.

References 

 
 

1151
ALCO locomotives
4-6-4 locomotives
Railway locomotives introduced in 1937
Steam locomotives of the United States
Scrapped locomotives
Standard gauge locomotives of the United States
Passenger locomotives